Theeran Adhigaaram Ondru is the soundtrack album composed by Ghibran, for the 2017 Tamil-language action thriller film of the same name directed by H. Vinoth and produced by S. R. Prakashbabu and S. R. Prabhu under the banner Dream Warrior Pictures, starring Karthi, Rakul Preet Singh and Abhimanyu Singh. The film is based on incidents from the Operation Bawaria case. The soundtrack consisted of seven songs, with lyrics written by Thamarai, Umadevi, Vivek, Raju Murugan, Ranjith, Udayakumar, Soundararajan and Ghibran himself penning for the album.

Most of the tracks (primary melody numbers) in the film were used as montages, and appear partially in the film, with exception for the sixth track in the album. The soundtrack consisted of varied genres had the aspects of a conventional Tamil film music. It was released at a soft launch on 2 November 2017. Both the albums were distributed and marketed by Aditya Music. The album was positively received, appreciating Ghibran for his work in the soundtrack and score.

Development 
The film marks Ghibran in his maiden collaboration with Karthi and H. Vinoth. The soundtrack to the film consisted of three melody songs, an item number, a sad song and an energetic track. Ghibran called Theeran Adhigaaram Ondru as his "first conventional Tamil film he is working after a long time" as his previous films were experimental and situational genres. Besides composing Ghibran had co-wrote lyrics for the track "Sevatha Pulla" with playback singer Ranjith, who also wrote the track. In his maiden attempt as a lyricist, Ghibran wrote few dummy lines, based on his college band experience and later re-wrote the same track with the lines have been alternatively changed. 

Ghibran made an extensive research on the film's background score as he felt that it is important as similar to the songs in the film. He further called Theeran, along with Aramm, had a lot of aspects in common like director’s clarity of thought, solid script, brilliant team and few others. The songs in the album, focused on the romantic angle in the film between Karthi and Rakul, appeared as sub-plot. It was partially used in the film as montages due to the limited screen time. The item number "Tinga Tinga", featuring Scarlett Mellish Wilson, was appeared in full length in the film. It further has two versions: the original version by Namitha Babu, and the dual version sung by Padmalatha, featured lyrics in Hindi.

Track list

Release 
The music rights of the film were purchased by Aditya Music. The audio launch of the film was scheduled to be held on a grand manner on 2 November 2017, but due to heavy rains prevailing in the Chennai, the makers had to abandon the plans and instead a soft launch was held at Sathyam Cinemas, Chennai with the cast and crew attending the event. The track "Sevatha Pulla" was launched exclusively through the music streaming platform Gaana, a day before the audio launch and received praise for the composition.

Reception 
V. Lakshmi, in her review for The Times of India, called the album as "purely commercial with elements of romance intact" and further said "Ghibran's formula (throw in an item song, a pacy number and a few melodies) works well in giving an album that predominantly has memorable tunes". Mridula Ramadugu of Firstpost further stated the soundtrack as "tailor-made" for the film and the cop story that is explored in it. Ramadugu stated "In Theeran Adhigaaram Ondru, Karthi plays the role of a cop for the second time after Siruthai (2011), so listeners expected this album to be a high octane one like the last. But what Ghibran gives us this time is a playlist filled with varied emotions and many subtle tracks rather than a music album of a typical entertainer." 

Behindwoods gave the album 2.75 stars (out of 5) stating it as "A pleasant album that is easy on the ears, but lacks the extra punch". In the 3-star rating for the album, Indiaglitz called the album as "hypnotic". Ramesh Kannan of Moviecrow gave three-and-a-half out of five and said "Ghibran delivers an impressive soundtrack for a commercial entertainer, with melodies standing-out in the album". Karthik Srinivasan of Milliblog wrote "Ghibran’s music is never uninteresting, but it can be good enough, like this soundtrack". A review from Sify stated "Ghibran’s background score is a huge strength for the film, his songs have been only used as montages but his re-recording elevates the chasing sequence to a different level".

Background score 
The original soundtrack to Theeran Adhigaaram Ondru was released in two volumes: the first volume was released on 20 January 2018, and the second volume released on 10 February 2018.

References

External links 

 

2017 soundtrack albums
Tamil film soundtracks
Soundtracks by Indian artists
Aditya Music soundtracks
Action film soundtracks
Thriller film soundtracks